{{speciesbox
|name = Bell-fruited mallee ash
|image = Eucalyptus codonocarpa habit.jpg
|image_caption = Eucalyptus codonocarpa in the Gibraltar Range National Park
|genus = Eucalyptus
|species = codonocarpa
| status = LC
| status_system = IUCN3.1
| status_ref = 
|authority = Blakely & McKie
|synonyms_ref =
|synonyms = 
 Eucalyptus approximans subsp. codonocarpa (Blakely & McKie) L.A.S.Johnson & Blaxell 
 Eucalyptus microcodon L.A.S.Johnson & K.D.Hill
}}Eucalyptus codonocarpa, commonly known as the bell-fruited mallee ash or New England mallee ash, is a flowering plant that is endemic to eastern Australia. It is a slender mallee with smooth, grey, yellow or brownish bark, lance-shaped to curved adult leaves, flowers buds in groups of three or seven, white flowers and bell-shaped fruit. It grows on the Northern Tablelands in New South Wales and nearby areas in Queensland.thumbnail|flower buds

The bark is smooth, grey, yellow or brownish and there are sometimes ribbons of shed bark hanging from the upper branches. Flowering occurs from March to June and the flowers are white.

Taxonomy and namingEucalyptus codonocarpa was first formally described in 1930 by the William Blakely and Ernest McKie in Proceedings of the Linnean Society of New South Wales. The specific epithet (codonocarpa) is derived from the Ancient Greek words kodon meaning "bell" and karpos'' meaning "fruit", referring to the shape of the fruit.

Distribution and habitat
Bell-fruited mallee ash grows in shrubland in sandy soil among granite outcrops north from Ebor on the Northern Tablelands and in adjacent areas in Queensland.

References

codonocarpa
Myrtales of Australia
Flora of New South Wales
Flora of Queensland
Plants described in 1930